Princess Eleonore of Hesse-Rheinfels-Rotenburg (Eleonore Philippina Christina Sophia; 17 October 1712 – 23 May 1759) was the consort of John Christian, Count Palatine of Sulzbach, whose two children were both by his first wife, Maria Henriette de La Tour d'Auvergne.

Biography
Born at the Landgrave’s Palace in Rotenburg an der Fulda she was the seventh child of Ernest Leopold, Landgrave of Hesse-Rotenburg by his wife, Countess Eleonore of Löwenstein-Wertheim-Rochefort. Her parents were first cousins, both being grandchildren of Ferdinand Karl, Count of Löwenstein-Wertheim-Rochefort. Her father, head of the only Roman Catholic branch of the House of Hesse, became ruler of Hesse-Rotenburg in 1725. She travelled to Turin where her sister Polyxena was the consort of Charles Emmanuel III of Sardinia.

Her husband had previously been married to Maria Henriette de La Tour d'Auvergne, who had died in 1728 after childbirth. He, too, was his wife's first cousin, Eleonore's father being a brother of John Christian's mother Maria Eleonore of Hesse-Rotenburg. She married John Christian in Mannheim on 21 January 1731. The next year, her husband succeeded as ruler of Sulzbach. The marriage remained childless and she became a widow in 1733. She traveled to Neuburg an der Donau where she died in 1759.

Ancestry

Bibliography

References

1712 births
1759 deaths
Landgravines of Hesse-Rotenburg
18th-century German people
House of Hesse-Kassel
Countesses Palatine of Sulzbach
People from Rotenburg an der Fulda
House of Wittelsbach
Daughters of monarchs